HSFC may refer to:

In Space Program:
Human Space Flight Centre, an Indian organisation.

In education:
Hartlepool Sixth Form College
Havering Sixth Form College
Hereford Sixth Form College

In association football:
Heybridge Swifts F.C.
Holwell Sports F.C.
Hullbridge Sports F.C.